Lakeshore East is one of the seven commuter rail lines of GO Transit in the Greater Toronto Area, Ontario, Canada. Buses from Oshawa connect to communities further east in Newcastle, Bowmanville and Peterborough.

History
The Lakeshore East line is the second oldest of GO's services, opening as part of the then-unified Lakeshore line on GO's first day of operations, 23 May 1967. It is ten minutes younger than its twin; although the first train from Pickering bound for Toronto left at 6:00 am that day, a 5:50 am departure from Oakville on Lakeshore West beat it into the record books.

On December 12, 1975, the Lakeshore East line was the site of the deadliest accident in the history of both the TTC and GO Transit, when a westbound GO train collided with a stalled TTC bus at a level crossing east of Scarborough GO station at St. Clair Ave. East. 9 bus passengers were killed and 20 others injured. The level crossing was later replaced by a railway overpass.

The line initially ran along the CN Kingston Subdivision from Union to Pickering. Just prior to the opening of GO service, CN had moved much of its freight operations from downtown areas to the new MacMillan Yard north of the city. To feed freight traffic from the east into the Yard, CN built the new York Subdivision across the top of the city (in what was then farmland) and connected the Yard to the Kingston Sub just west of Pickering at Pickering Junction. This offloaded the majority of traffic from the Kingston Sub between Pickering Junction and Union, allowing ample scheduling room for GO service. Sections of the Kingston Sub to the east of Pickering Junction remained in use as the mainline to Montreal, and CN did not have capacity to allow GO traffic on these sections.

GO had originally planned to address this as part of a much larger project known as GO-Urban, and later, GO ALRT. GO ALRT would have used a new electric train car running on a dedicated right-of-way between Pickering and its terminus to the east of Harmony Road on the far eastern edge of Oshawa. ALRT was to have followed the CN lines east to Whitby, then across the 401 to follow the CP Belleville Sub, which runs in parallel on the north side of the 401. Stations would be built at Pickering, Ajax, Whitby, Hopkins (west edge of Oshawa), Simcoe (downtown Oshawa), Oshawa east (at Stevenson) and finally Harmony. First proposed in 1982, ALRT lived for only a short time before it was cancelled in 1985 with a change of government.

Instead, the basic alignment planned for ALRT from Pickering to Oshawa was laid using conventional track, splitting off at Pickering Junction and running under the York Sub bridge over the 401 in a complex basket weave. It ran along the original ALRT layout to Whitby, but abandoned the 401 overpass and instead continued along the CN lines to the current Oshawa GO Station on the far western edge of town. The new lines were laid in sections, reaching Oshawa in 1995. Until 29 December 2006, weekend and holiday trains still ended in Pickering, but service is now offered along the entire route every day of the year.

In December 1993, GO Transit initiated a program for the eastward expansion of the Lakeshore East line, for which it received approval in 1994. GO Transit undertook a study to determine whether to use the tracks of Canadian Pacific Railway or Canadian National Railway.

Metrolinx purchased the Kingston Sub between Pickering Junction and Union on 31 March 2011 and now completely owns the Lakeshore East corridor.

On 29 June 2013, off-peak service was improved to every 30 minutes.  On 24 September 2018, weekday mid-day service frequency was improved again, now operating every 15 minutes.

As of July 2020, seven level crossings remain on the line.

Service
As of September 2021, local service operates every 15 minutes on weekdays and every 30 minutes on weekends.

Express services have been temporarily suspended to facilitate track construction between Union Station and Danforth.

Station list

Most off-peak trains, as well as some peak trains, continue as part of the Lakeshore West corridor after stopping at Union. With few exceptions, it is possible to travel from Oshawa to Aldershot, West Harbour or Niagara Falls without changing trains in Toronto.

Expansion

Bowmanville expansion
In 2008, Metrolinx published its regional transportation entitled The Big Move. As part of this, the agency identified an express all-day service between Hamilton and Oshawa (via Toronto Union) as one of its top 15 priorities.
Metrolinx also committed to eventually providing service every 15 minutes on the line, as well as electrifying railways. This project, dubbed Regional Express Rail (now called GO Expansion), was expected to reduce some trip times by 20%.
Continued growth of the Oshawa area has led to renewed calls for expansion of the Lakeshore East line, this time all the way to Bowmanville. On June 20, 2016, it was announced that the line will be extended to Bowmanville; at that time, the extension was expected to open in 2024.

Part of the Bowmanville extension would be along a new GO Transit spur line connecting the CNR rail corridor south of Highway 401 to CP Rail's Belleville Subdivision further north. Metrolinx considered three proposals for this spur. In a 2011 proposal, the spur would have branched off west of Oshawa GO Station, crossed over Highway 401 and Stellar Drive on bridges, turned east passing under Thornton Road and under CP Rail's GM spur servicing a General Motors Canada manufacturing plant.
In February 2020, Metrolinx proposed instead that the GO spur branch off east of Oshawa GO Station and utilize the existing GM spur to connect to the CPR corridor.
However, in November 2020, CP Rail advised Metrolinx to develop an independent alignment as the GM plant it served at the south end of the GM spur would reopen. Thus, in 2021, Metrolinx proposed a separate alignment east of Oshawa GO to cross Highway 401 on a new bridge parallel to the GM spur bridge, and then cross over that spur on another bridge to run eastwards parallel to CP Rail's Belleville Subdivision. Between Oshawa and Bowmanville, GO Transit trains would be operating on its own track independent from freight operations on the CP Belleville division. Metrolinx prefers its 2021 proposal.

The Bowmanville Extension would have four new stations: Thornton's Corners, Oshawa Central (at Ritson Road), Darlington (Courtice), and Bowmanville. Trains on the Bowmanville Extension would operate every hour on weekdays and every two hours on weekends.

Corridor expansion
The Lakeshore East Rail Corridor Expansion project is to prepare the Lakeshore East line for the addition of a fourth track and for electrification. Construction tasks along the corridor include:
 Widening of the Warden Avenue overpass bridge.
 Widening of the Danforth Avenue overpass bridge.
 Constructing retaining walls along the railway embankment between Wolcott Avenue and Warden Avenue.
 Constructing a retaining wall along the railway embankment between Main Street and Victoria Park Avenue.
 Constructing a retaining wall along the railway embankment in the Small's Creek area.
 Widening the railway embankment between the Don River and Gerrard Street to accommodate four GO train tracks plus two tracks for the planned Ontario Line.
 Building East Harbour station providing four tracks for GO trains plus two tracks for the Ontario Line.

Rouge River bridge

The Rouge River bridge carries GO Transit's Lakeshore East line over the Rouge River at the city limits of both Toronto and Pickering. Constructed about 1905, the bridge is listed as a provincial heritage property. It has two ashlar stone masonry end piers supporting a steel deck truss structure. It is one of only a few bridges of this design in the Greater Toronto Area.

In late 2021, Metrolinx started rehabilitation work to extend the life of the bridge by another 20 years. Because of its heritage status, Metrolinx decided not to replace the bridge. Rehabilitation of the bridge was completed in late 2022.

References

External links

 GO Transit: Lakeshore East GO Train & Bus Service

GO Transit
Passenger rail transport in Toronto
Rail transport in the Regional Municipality of Durham
Rail transport in Pickering, Ontario
Rail transport in Ajax, Ontario
Rail transport in Whitby, Ontario
Rail transport in Oshawa
Transport in Clarington
Railway lines opened in 1967
1967 establishments in Ontario